Lester Winfield Patterson (July 24, 1893 – November 15, 1947) was an American lawyer, politician, and judge from New York.

Life 
Patterson was born on July 24, 1893. He was the son of Edward J. Patterson, cashier for Bronx County clerk Vincent J. Ganley and Surrogate George M. S. Schultz, and Lillian C.

Patterson grew up on the lower end of the Bronx. He attended St. Jerome's Parochial School. He graduated from Fordham Preparatory School in 1911, Fordham College with a B.A. in 1915, and Fordham Law School in 1917. After graduating from the latter school, he enlisted in the Army and served overseas with the 105th Field Artillery. He was admitted to the bar in 1920 and had a law office in the Bronx. After he was discharged from the Army in 1919, he became a captain in the Officers Reserve Corps.

In 1921, Patterson was elected to the New York State Assembly as a Democrat, representing the Bronx County 2nd District. He served in the Assembly in 1922, 1923, 1924, and 1925. In 1925, he was elected Sheriff of Bronx County. He held the office from 1926 to 1930. He then served as County Clerk for four years. He was then elected County Judge, a position he was re-elected to shortly before his death.

Patterson was a member of St. Gabriel's Church in Riverdale when he died, although he previously attended St. Jerome's Church. He was a member of the Elks, the Knights of Columbus, the Lions Club, and the Winged Foot Golf Club. In 1926, he married Ethyle Madeline Lang. Their children were Joan, Eunice, and Ellis.

Patterson died at Mount Sinai Hospital on November 15, 1947. He was buried in the Gate of Heaven Cemetery.

The Patterson Houses in Mott Haven was named after him.

See also 
 145th New York State Legislature (1922)
 145th New York State Legislature (1923)
 145th New York State Legislature (1924)
 145th New York State Legislature (1925)

References

External links 

 The Political Graveyard
 Lester W. Patterson at Find a Grave

1893 births
1947 deaths
Sheriffs of Bronx County, New York
Fordham Preparatory School alumni
Fordham University School of Law alumni
United States Army personnel of World War I
20th-century American lawyers
Lawyers from New York City
20th-century American politicians
Democratic Party members of the New York State Assembly
20th-century American judges
County judges in the United States
New York (state) state court judges
Catholics from New York (state)
Burials at Gate of Heaven Cemetery (Hawthorne, New York)
People from the Bronx